Manjakandriana is a town and commune in Manjakandriana District, Analamanga Region, in the  Central Highlands of Madagascar. It is located 47 km east of Antananarivo on the Route Nationale RN2 and the railway line from Antananarivo - Toamasina.

Economy
The economy is based on agriculture.  Rice, maize, peanuts, beans, manioc are the main crops.

Local Attractions

References

Populated places in Analamanga